Jonathan Wiesen is an American history professor. He is a professor of modern European history at the University of Alabama at Birmingham and teaches courses on modern German history and the Holocaust.

Wiesen's book West German Industry and the Challenge of the Nazi Past, 1945-1955 (2001) won the Hagley Prize in Business History in 2002.  He is also coeditor of Selling Modernity: Advertising in 20th Century Germany (2007) and author of Creating the Nazi Marketplace: Commerce and Consumption in the Third Reich (2011).

External links
Faculty Page at UAB 
What do decaffeinated coffee and Hitler have to do with each other?
Nuremberg's Echoes 
German Industry and the Third Reich *
Nazis, Jews, and African Americans at Charlottesville 

Historians of Europe
Southern Illinois University Carbondale faculty
Living people
Year of birth missing (living people)